Egira tibori is a species of moth of the family Noctuidae. It is endemic to the eastern part of the Mediterranean, the Balkans, Turkey, Israel, Lebanon and Jordan.

Adults are on wing from February to May. There is one generation per year.

The larvae probably feed on various herbaceous plants and trees.

External links
 Hadeninae of Israel

Orthosiini
Moths of Europe
Moths of Asia
Moths of the Middle East